Evelyn Tripp (1927-1995) was a leading fashion model of the 1950s and 1960s.

Evelyn Tripp was born in Flat River, Missouri, in 1927, the daughter of a lead miner.

Tripp was discovered by an assistant to Louise Dahl-Wolfe, the Harper's Bazaar photographer, whilst working as a clerical assistant when shopping on New York's Fifth Avenue.

She appeared on the cover of 40  magazines, starting with Vogue in January 1949.

She was married to Stan Young. She died of colon cancer at her home in Remsenburg, Long Island, New York, aged 67.

References

1927 births
1995 deaths
People from Park Hills, Missouri
Female models from Missouri
Deaths from colorectal cancer
20th-century American women
20th-century American people